Seraphim Falls is a 2006 American revisionist Western film directed by television producer and director David Von Ancken in his only feature film. The storyline was conceived from a screenplay written by Von Ancken and Abby Everett Jaques. The fictional story focuses on a bounty hunt for a Union soldier by a Confederate colonel following the American Civil War in the late 1860s. Pierce Brosnan, Liam Neeson, Michael Wincott, Tom Noonan, and Ed Lauter star in principal roles. Seraphim Falls explores civil topics, such as violence, human survival and war.

The film was produced by the motion picture studio of Icon Productions. It was commercially distributed by Samuel Goldwyn Films and Destination Films theatrically, and by Sony Pictures Home Entertainment for home media. The film score was composed by musician Harry Gregson-Williams, although a soundtrack version for the motion picture was not released to the public.

Seraphim Falls premiered at the 2006 Toronto International Film Festival and was released to theatres in limited release in the United States on January 26, 2007, grossing $418,296 in domestic ticket sales. It earned an additional $801,762 in box office business overseas for a combined worldwide total of $1,220,058 in revenue. The film generally received positive critical reviews before its initial screening in cinemas.

Notable similarities have been found between the film and the 1976 revisionist western, The Outlaw Josey Wales directed by Clint Eastwood.

Plot
In 1868, within the Ruby Mountains, Gideon roasts hare over an open fire. Suddenly, gunshots ring out with one striking his left arm. He grabs what he can and races down the mountain. His attackers emerge from their cover to inspect his campsite. Colonel Morsman Carver, a former Confederate officer, is accompanied by Pope, Hayes, Parsons and the Kid, who are all engaged in a bounty operation to apprehend him.

After removing the bullet from his arm with his hunting knife at a secluded location, Gideon leaves an open fire burning, which attracts the posse. He ends up killing Pope with his knife and then ventures out again into the wilderness. He attempts to steal a horse, but is caught by a young woman named Charlotte who helps him after she realises he is injured. She dresses his wound and her family let him sleep overnight in their farmhouse. He later offers to buy their horse and leaves before daybreak. As the group of men approach Gideon's trail, he lays an ambush using a bear trap which impales the Kid, who is then shot by Carver as an act of mercy. Later, Parsons decides to leave the other men following the discovery of a dead bank robber, whom Gideon had killed earlier in an act of self-defence and whose bounty money exceeds Gideon's. As Parsons is preparing to load the dead body to take to Carson City for the reward money, Carver shoots the horse – which he declares is his – leaving Parsons to walk the 30 miles back to town carrying the body.

Coming across a railroad under construction, Gideon hitches his horse and steals some food. The foreman recognises the horse as stolen and detains Gideon. Carver and his remaining man, Hayes, also reach the railroad site and search for Gideon. Meanwhile, he escapes from custody and makes off with another horse. As Carver and Hayes draw closer, Gideon's horse can no longer take the strain of the heat and collapses. Gideon euthanises the horse with his knife. When Carver and Hayes finally reach the horse's carcass, Hayes dismounts and marvels at what type of an animal would disembowel the creature. Suddenly Gideon leaps out from the horse's belly, where he had been hiding, and grabs Hayes, threatening to kill him if Carver doesn't give up his gun. Carver instead shoots Hayes with his last bullet. Confronting each other, Carver and Gideon recall the events that put them at odds. After the end of the American Civil War, Gideon was ordered to track down former Confederate officers. When he arrived at Carver's home in Seraphim Falls to interrogate him, Carver was out in a nearby field. To coerce Carver's wife into revealing his whereabouts, and believing that their house was empty, Gideon orders their barn to be set on fire. The blaze quickly spreads to the house, as Carver returns from the cropland. While the soldiers restrain him, his wife and son run inside the house to save their infant child who is still in a bedroom. Both men look on with horror at the unfolding tragedy; trapped by the flames, Carver's wife and children perish. Gideon, racked with guilt over the tragedy, is seen dropping his gunbelt and walking away from his men.

The two men fight, Gideon eventually getting the better of Carver. He points Carver in the direction of a town and tells him that he will get nothing but torment if he continues his pursuit. Gideon takes the horses ridden by Carver and Hayes and sets off deeper into the countryside. When Carver later catches up with Gideon, both men are on the brink of exhaustion. They confront each other again with their pistols. Gideon shoots Carver in the side but, instead of finishing him off, he offers himself to Carver. Carver decides not to shoot him and throws his pistol aside. Gideon helps Carver to his feet and the two men walk into the distance away from each other. As a final gesture Gideon abandons his knife (his primary tool throughout the film), throwing it into the ground.

Cast

 Liam Neeson as Colonel Morsman Carver: Like Brosnan, Neeson described being "kind of steeped in that western mythology growing up in Ireland." He likened his character, Carver, to Captain Ahab in Moby-Dick, "he's [Carver] totally governed by this idea of revenge where he’s practically lost his humanity."
 Pierce Brosnan as Gideon: The role was originally to be played by Richard Gere but after he dropped out, Pierce Brosnan replaced him. Brosnan spoke of his love of Western films during production and promotion of Seraphim Falls, which had stemmed from watching them as a child in Ireland.
 Michael Wincott as Hayes
 Xander Berkeley as McKenzy, a railway foreman.
 Ed Lauter as Parsons
 Tom Noonan as Minister Abraham
 Kevin J. O'Connor as Henry
 John Robinson as Kid
 Anjelica Huston as Madame Louise, a vanishing con artist (and possible religious allegory), who figures in the end of the film. Huston first joined the cast in November 2005.
 Angie Harmon as Rose
 Robert Baker as Pope
 Wes Studi as Charon
 Jimmi Simpson as Big Brother
 James Jordan as Little Brother
 Nate Mooney as Cousin Bill
 Shannon Zeller as Charlotte
 Adon Cravens as Nathaniel
 Boots Southerland as Tall Henchman

Production

Filming
David Von Ancken first researched the script for six months before joining Abby Everett Jaques to create the screenplay. The film was originally announced at the Cannes Film Festival with Liam Neeson and Richard Gere in the lead roles. Gere dropped out in August 2005 and was soon replaced by Pierce Brosnan. Shooting on Seraphim Falls started on October 17, 2005 and actress Anjelica Huston later joined the cast the following November. The film was filmed on location for 48 days, primarily in New Mexico; some of the opening scenes were filmed along the McKenzie River in Oregon.

Oscar-winning cinematographer John Toll was responsible for cinematography work on the film. Toll later noted it was a "great opportunity to work with a director who was interested in visual storytelling."

Music
The soundtrack, composed by Harry Gregson-Williams, was produced at Bastyr University's chapel in Kenmore, Washington. Gregson-Williams wrote the music in three or four weeks, describing it as "very atmospheric". However, a CD soundtrack version of the film's score was never released to the public. The sound effects in the film were supervised by Kami Asgar. The mixing of the sound elements were orchestrated by William Sarokin and mastered by Steve Maslow.

Reception

Box office
The film premiered in cinemas on January 26, 2007, in limited release throughout the U.S.. During its opening weekend, the film opened in a distant 42nd place grossing $155,560 in business showing at 52 locations. The comedy film, Epic Movie came in first place during that weekend grossing $18,612,544. The film's revenue dropped by 49% in its second week of release, earning $79,181. For that particular weekend, the film fell to 48th place screening in 48 theaters. The film The Messengers, unseated Epic Movie to open in first place grossing $14,713,321 in box office revenue. During its final weekend in release, Seraphim Falls opened in 73rd place with $10,526 in revenue. The film went on to top out domestically at $418,296 in total ticket sales through a 6-week theatrical run. Internationally, the film took in an additional $801,762 in box office business for a combined worldwide total of $1,220,058. For 2007 as a whole, the film would cumulatively rank at a box office performance position of 276.

Critical response
On Rotten Tomatoes, the film has an approval rating of 55%, based on reviews from 85 critics, with an average score of 5.7 out of 10. The website's consensus reads, "A brutal, slow-moving drama that unfolds among some great-looking scenery." On Metacritic, the film has a weighted average score of 62 out of 100, based on 21 reviews, indicating "generally favorable reviews".

Claudia Puig writing for USA Today thought the film was a "psychological drama with an intriguing ambiguity that challenges the viewer's loyalties and preconceived notions." Stephen Holden writing in The New York Times applauded the visuals, saying "Its strongest element is the austere majesty of the cinematography by John Toll ("Braveheart," "Legends of the Fall," "The Thin Red Line"), in which the severe beauty of the Western landscape looms over the characters as a silent rebuke." Writing for The Austin Chronicle, Josh Rosenblatt viewed it as "Meditative, beautifully shot, and blessed with a healthy dose of cynicism" and a "morality play without the morality and a Western Purgatorio that, in the end, demands its protagonists resign themselves to their loneliness and brutality and avail themselves of the redemptive power of sheer exhaustion." Author Joshua Rothkopf of Time Out commented it "has all the good looks of its wintry Oregon locales, not to mention the equally craggy faces of Liam Neeson and a grizzled-up Pierce Brosnan, embroiled in a Fugitive-like pursuit with the latter on the run." Peter Rainer of The Christian Science Monitor called it "essentially one long, bleak stalk-and-kill action thriller", adding "The film functions as a kind of survivalists' guide, and there's a morbid pleasure in seeing how Gideon extricates himself from one impossible situation after another."

In a mixed review, Christy Lemire mused about the lead characters: "Their climactic confrontation is visually arresting in its starkness. But as an anti-war statement, a call to lay down arms that's clearly intended to be relevant today, it's a bit too clunky in its literalism." She ultimately found the film to be "technically solid" but a "dramatically unremarkable Western". Todd McCarthy of Variety believed the film was "nothing rousing or new" and that Brosnan and Neeson wouldn't be enough "to muster more than modest theatrical B.O. for this very physical but familiar oater", but praised the cinematography, noting "Toll's work, which emphasizes the blues and greens of the forests, is always a pleasure to behold". Kevin Crust of the Los Angeles Times was critical of the ending: "A beautifully shot chase film [...] it moves along with minimalist efficiency before running out of gas during an overlong allegorical final section." Columnist Joe Morgenstern of The Wall Street Journal noted, "things take a turn from simplicity to sententiousness, then to surreal silliness, and finally to a mano-à-mano contest, on a parched desert floor, over which man gets the best close-ups."

Following its cinematic release in 2007, Seraphim Falls received a nomination from the Gotham Awards for the Breakthrough Director Award. In 2008, the film won the "Best Specialty Stunt" award from the Taurus World Stunt Awards for Mark Vanselow and Craig Hosking.

Home media
The film was released on DVD in the United States on May 15, 2007. Currently, there are several European Blu-ray releases of the film, although it is also available in other media formats such as video on demand.

See also

 List of Western films of the 2000s

References

External links
 
 
 
 
 
 

2006 films
2006 directorial debut films
2006 drama films
2006 psychological thriller films
2006 Western (genre) films
2000s action drama films
2000s road movies
American Civil War films
American Western (genre) films
American chase films
American films about revenge
American road movies
American survival films
2000s English-language films
Films about death
Films produced by Bruce Davey
Films scored by Harry Gregson-Williams
Films set in 1867
Films set in Nevada
Films shot in New Mexico
Films shot in Oregon
Icon Productions films
2000s survival films
2000s American films